Jason Sheltzer is a cancer biologist at the Yale University School of Medicine.

Education 
Sheltzer received a BA in molecular biology from Princeton University and a PhD in biology from the Massachusetts Institute of Technology. At MIT, Sheltzer performed his PhD research with Angelika Amon on the consequences of aneuploidy. Sheltzer then established his own research group as an independent fellow at Cold Spring Harbor Laboratory. In 2021 Sheltzer was recruited to move his lab to Yale University.

Career and research 
Sheltzer uses CRISPR/Cas9 technology to study aneuploidy and cancer genomics. Through the use of chromosome engineering, he has constructed cancer cells with different degrees of aneuploidy, and he has found how aneuploidy affects tumor suppression and metastasis. In 2019, he discovered a set of copy number alteration biomarkers that can be used to predict cancer patient outcomes. His research has questioned whether anti-cancer drugs could be acting through alternate mechanisms. He has also investigated the regulation of ACE2, the receptor for SARS-CoV-2. His work identified a link between cigarette smoke exposure and ACE2 over-expression, which could make smokers and COPD patients more vulnerable to COVID19.   

Sheltzer also studies gender disparities in biology research. He discovered that some faculty members, like Nobel Prize winners, tended to hire very few female students in their labs, which could contribute to the gender gap in STEM.

Awards and honors 

 Forbes Magazine, 30 under 30 in Science
 American Society for Cell Biology, Gilula Prize
 White House Office of Science and Technology, Presidential Early-Career Science and Engineering Award

References 

Cancer researchers
Year of birth missing (living people)
Living people
21st-century American biologists
Massachusetts Institute of Technology School of Science alumni
Princeton University alumni